The 2009–10 Vysshaya Liga season was the 18th season of the Vysshaya Liga, the second level of ice hockey in Russia. 27 teams participated in the league. HC Yugra won the championship, and was promoted to the Kontinental Hockey League

First round

Western Conference

Central Conference

Eastern Conference

Playoffs

External links 
 Season on hockeyarchives.info
 Season on hockeyarchives.ru

2009–10 in Russian ice hockey leagues
Rus
Russian Major League seasons